The 1856 United States presidential election in Mississippi was held on November 4, 1856. Mississippi voters chose seven electors to represent the state in the Electoral College, which chose the president and vice president.

Mississippi was won by Senator James Buchanan (D–Pennsylvania), running with Representative and future presidential candidate in the 1860 presidential election John C. Breckinridge, with 59.44% of the popular vote, against the 13th president of the United States Millard Fillmore (W–New York), running with the 2nd United States Ambassador to Germany Andrew Jackson Donelson, with 40.56% of the popular vote.

The Republican Party nominee John C. Frémont was not on the ballot in the state.

Results

References 

1856
Mississippi
1856 Mississippi elections